The list of shipwrecks in July 1881 includes ships sunk, foundered, grounded, or otherwise lost during July 1881.

1 July

2 July

3 July

4 July

5 July

6 July

7 July

11 July

12 July

14 July

15 July

16 July

17 July

18 July

20 July

21 July

25 July

26 July

27 July

28 July

30 July

31 July

Unknown date

References

1881-07
Maritime incidents in July 1881